The 1948 United States presidential election in Georgia took place on November 2, 1948, as part of the wider United States presidential election. Voters chose 12 representatives, or electors, to the Electoral College, who voted for president and vice president.

Background
With the exception of a handful of historically Unionist North Georgia counties – chiefly Fannin but also to a lesser extent Pickens, Gilmer and Towns – Georgia since the 1880s had been a one-party state dominated by the Democratic Party. Disfranchisement of almost all African-Americans and most poor whites had made the Republican Party virtually nonexistent outside of local governments in those few hill counties, and the national Democratic Party served as the guardian of white supremacy against a Republican Party historically associated with memories of Reconstruction. The only competitive elections were Democratic primaries, which state laws restricted to whites on the grounds of the Democratic Party being legally a private club.

Dixiecrat revolt
However, on February 2, 1948, incumbent President Harry S. Truman, fearing that the antidemocratic practices and racial discrimination of the South would severely denigrate the United States' reputation in the Cold War, launched the first Civil Rights bill since the end of Reconstruction, along with an executive order for desegregation of the military. Mississippi Governor Fielding Wright had already sounded a call for revolt, which he took to the Southern Governors Conference at Wakulla Springs, Florida, to say that calls for civil rights legislation by national Democrats would not be tolerated in Dixie.

After Truman was renominated at the 1948 Democratic National Convention, Southern Democrats walked out and convened at Birmingham, Alabama on July 17, nominating South Carolina Governor James Strom Thurmond for president and Mississippi Governor Fielding L. Wright for vice president.

Given that Georgia had no threat from the Republican Party and a relatively high proportion of African Americans in its population, one would have expected the Peach State to oppose Truman's civil rights platform and nominate Thurmond as the official Democratic Party candidate. However, leading "conservative" gubernatorial candidate Herman Talmadge had experienced the three governors controversy in 1947 which removed him from office until a special election was to be held concurrently with the presidential election. Herman consequently feared that if he supported Thurmond for president, Truman loyalists would challenge him for governor in the concurrent general election.

Thus, although most of the Talmadge faction was pro-Thurmond, it did not nominate as Democratic electors candidates pledged to support Thurmond and Fielding Wright, unlike the anti-Long faction in Louisiana. Thurmond and Wright thus had to take their place on the ballot as the "States' Rights" party. Interim Governor Thompson also played an important role in ensuring the "Democratic" label would be given to electors supporting the national ticket.

Vote
Because Southern senators and congressmen had their seniority to worry about as it determined places on committees, few of Georgia's congressmen would risk openly supporting Thurmond once Truman was established as the "Democratic" candidate. Consequently, Truman had no trouble carrying the state by 40.49%, and Thurmond gained a majority in just 10 of 159 counties. Almost all of these Thurmond counties were located adjacent to the South Carolina governor's home county of Edgefield, South Carolina, while in most counties north of Atlanta, Thurmond's percentage remained in single figures.

Results

Results by county

References

Notes

Georgia
1948
1948 Georgia (U.S. state) elections